, also known as , was a Japanese samurai daimyō of the Sengoku period.  Fujitaka was a prominent retainer of Ashikaga Yoshiaki, the last Ashikaga shōgun. When he joined the Oda, Oda Nobunaga rewarded him with the fief of Tango and went on to become one of the Oda clan's senior generals.

Biography
In 1568, Fujitaka joined Oda clan after Oda Nobunaga captured Kyoto. In late 1568, Fujitaka along with Shibata Katsuie, Hachiya Yoritaka, Mori Yoshinari and Sakai Masahisa attacking Iwanari Tomomichi one of Miyoshi Sanninshu at Shōryūji Castle, Iwanari subsequently was killed in battle by Fujitaka.

In 1569, after Nobunaga and his followers returned from Kyoto, the Miyoshi clan attacked Shogun Ashikaga Yoshiaki at Honkokuji castle, Fujitaka along with Akechi Mitsuhide defend the shōgun and repulsed the Miyoshi clan.

In 1576, Fujitaka fought in the ten years campaign against Ikkō-ikki in the Ishiyama Hongan-ji War, along with Harada Naomasa, Akechi Mitsuhide and Araki Murashige.

In 1577, Fujitaka along with Akechi Mitsuhide and Tsutsui Junkei rendered distinguished services in the Siege of Shigisan against Matsunaga Hisahide, who had raised a standard of revolt against Nobunaga.

In 1579, Fujitaka build Tanabe castle under orders from Oda Nobunaga to conquer Tango province.

In 1580, he attacked Tango alone, failing due to a counterattack from the Isshiki clan, but he finally succeeded with the help of Akechi Mitsuhide.

In 1582, after the death of Oda Nobunaga on Incident at Honnō-ji, Fujitaka refused to join Akechi Mitsuhide for the Battle of Yamazaki, despite the fact that his son, Hosokawa Tadaoki, was married to Akechi's daughter, Hosokawa Gracia. Later, Fujitaka shaved his head in the Buddhist tonsure, changed his name to the priestly "Yūsai", and delegated his status as daimyō to Tadaoki. However, he remained an active force in politics as a cultural advisor, under both Toyotomi Hideyoshi and Tokugawa Ieyasu. 

In 1585, he joined at the Siege of Negoroji, Hideyoshi granted Fujitaka a retirement estate worth 3,000 koku in Yamashiro Province in 1586.

In 1587, he fought in the Kyushu Campaign as a general and Hideyoshi added another 3,000 koku at Osumi Province in 1595.

In 1600, Ishida Mitsunari had asked Fujitaka to join the Western Army, but Fujitaka refused due to one of Ishida's schemes which resulted in Gracia's and his granddaughter's death.

As a general in the Eastern Army, he garrisoned Tanabe castle with around 500 soldiers. When Tanabe Castle was besieged by the Western Army. The commanding general of the siege had great respect for Fujitaka, because of this, the attack lacked the usual spirit involved in a samurai siege: the attackers amused themselves by shooting the walls with cannons loaded only with gunpowder. 
Fujitaka laid down arms only after an imperial decree from Emperor Go-Yōzei. However, this was 19 days before Battle of Sekigahara, and neither he nor his attackers were able to join the battle.

Death
Fujitaka died on October 6, 1610. He was buried in Kyoto but has a second grave in Kumamoto, where his grandson Hosokawa Tadatoshi ruled.

Family
 Grandfather: Hosokawa Motoari (1459 - 1500)
 Father: Mitsubuchi Harukazu (1500-1570)
 Mother: Chisein
 Foster Father: Hosokawa Mototsune
 Wife: Numata Jako (1544-1618)
 Children:
 Hosokawa Tadaoki
 Hosokawa Okimoto (1566-1619)
 Hosokawa Yukitaka (1571-1607)
 Hosokawa Takayuki
 Itohime
 Senhime
 Kurihime
 Kagahime

See also
 Hosokawa clan

References

Further reading 

1534 births
1610 deaths
Daimyo
Izumi-Hosokawa clan
Japanese Buddhist clergy
Japanese poets
Oda retainers
Ōshū-Hosokawa clan
Toyotomi retainers
Deified Japanese people
People from Kyoto